Commack is a hamlet and census-designated place (CDP) that roughly corresponds to the hamlet by the same name in the towns of Huntington and Smithtown in Suffolk County, on Long Island, in New York. The CDP's population was 36,124 at the 2010 census.

History 
The name "Commack" comes from the Secatogue Native American tribe who lived on the South Shore of Long Island between Copiague and Bayport. The Secatogue named their northern lands in the center of the island Winnecomac which means "pleasant lands." The name may have been inspired because of the area's flat lands with rich soil, and thick oak forests abounding with plants and wildlife. From its earliest days, Commack or originally spelled as Comac was known for its fertile soil which made it the perfect land for farming. 

Today all of Commack is settled and suburbanized and, like most unincorporated areas of Long Island, does not have a true, walkable downtown or "Main Street".

Geography

Demographics

As of the census of 2010, there were 36,124 people, 11,907 households, and 9,895 families residing in the CDP. The population density was 3,010.3 per square mile (1,165.3/km2). There were 12,138 housing units at an average density of 1,011.5/sq mi (391.5/km2). The racial makeup of the CDP was 91.6% White, 0.9% African American, 0.1% Native American or Alaska Native, 5.4% Asian, 0.01% Native Hawaiian or other Pacific Islander, 0.8% from some other race, and 1.2% from two or more races. Hispanic or Latino of any race were 4.8% of the population.

In the CDP the population was spread out, with 26.0% under the age of 18, 6.2% from 18 to 24, 21.5% from 25 to 44, 29.5% from 45 to 64, and 16.8% who were 65 years of age or older. The median age was 43.0 years. For every 100 females, there were 94.1 males. For every 100 females age 18 and over, there were 90.6 males.

According to Census Bureau estimates for 2009-2011, the median income for a household in the CDP was $102,008, and the median income for a family was $114,866. Males had a median income of $83,135 versus $63,185 for females. The per capita income for the CDP was $40,320. About 2.1% of families and 2.9% of the population were below the poverty line, including 1.7% of those under age 18 and 5.0% of those age 65 or over.

Transportation 
Commack is served by four major thoroughfares: the Long Island Expressway, the Northern State Parkway, the Sunken Meadow State Parkway and the at-grade Jericho Turnpike. It also includes the historic Long Island Motor Parkway, which itself included the spur to NY 25 that later became Harned Road.

Landmarks

Commack is home to the oldest Methodist Church building in New York state, the Commack Methodist Church, built in 1789 as the Comac Church. It is listed on the National Register of Historic Places and is one of the oldest buildings in Commack.

The American Basketball Association's New York Nets, later the New Jersey Nets, and now the Brooklyn Nets, played their second season (1968–69) at the Long Island Arena in Commack. Musician Peter Frampton recorded some tracks for the album Frampton Comes Alive! during a concert at the arena. The Eastern Hockey League's Long Island Ducks also played there. The arena, demolished in 1996, is now the site of a shopping center that includes Hobby Lobby and Target stores.

The National Jewish Sports Hall of Fame and Museum is located in the Suffolk Y Jewish Community Center in Commack.

The Commack Fire Department celebrated its centennial in 2006.

Sunshine Acres was built sometime in the mid-1800s and was home to Dr. Darling B. Whitney. The property was sold to the Brooklyn Baptist Young Peoples Union in 1915 and became a fresh air home, or camp, named Sunshine Acres. The house was located on Townline Road just north of the Methodist Church and served as the main building for the camp. The dorms, dining hall, and chapel were on top of the hill across the fields.

Commack Volunteer Ambulance Corps celebrated its 50th anniversary in 2016.

Harned Brothers Sawmill was built in the 1840s and has been run by the Harned family since the Great Depression.  It is the only circular-sawmill still in operation on Long Island.

Notable people
                                                                   
 Bob Costas (born 1952), television sportscaster and commentator 
 Craig Greenberg (born 1973), businessman, lawyer, and politician; Mayor-elect of Louisville
 Pete Harnisch, Major League Baseball pitcher
 Matt Milano, National Football League linebacker for the Buffalo Bills
 Rosie O'Donnell, stand-up comedian, actress, singer, author, talk show hostess and media personality; Commack High School Class of 1980
 Shankar Pillai, professional poker player
 Samantha Prahalis, WNBA basketball player
 Randy Rainbow, comedian
 Ashley Reyes, actress and star of The CW revival of the television series Walker

In popular culture
On November 14, 2006, radio station WBLI rated the Commack Motor Inn second of the seven wonders of Long Island, just behind the Flanders Duck and ahead of the Montauk Lighthouse. The Commack Inn gained notoriety by its advertisements on late-night television and radio, extolling "the perfect romantic getaway", its  "plush beds", "mirror ball disco room" and "heart-shaped love tubs". By the 1980s, the Commack Motor Inn had become such an accepted part of Long Island life that its gift certificates were prizes at social clubs. In a 1994 interview, actress Rosie O'Donnell recounted, "That's where everyone in high school went to have their first sexual experience."

In the American television program Criminal Minds, Special Agent David Rossi's hometown is Commack. One episode in the fifth season of the same show is set in Commack (although it was shot in Los Angeles).

Commack Middle School was also on one of MTV's True Life episodes.

American rock band Wheatus heavily referenced Commack satirically on their 2000 debut album in their song Wannabe Gangstar.

See also
 Commack School District

References

External links

 Commack History
 Commack Fire Department
 The Record, weekly newspaper covering Commack

Huntington, New York
Smithtown, New York
Census-designated places in Suffolk County, New York
Hamlets in Suffolk County, New York